Sanchez High School may refer to:
 Simon Sanchez High School - Yigo, Guam
 George I. Sanchez High School (charter) - Houston, Texas